Henri Schoeman (born 3 October 1991) is a South African triathlete. He represented his country at the 2016 ITU Grand Final in Cozumel, where he won the gold medal; the 2016 Summer Olympics, where he won a bronze medal; and the 2014 Commonwealth Games, where he won a silver medal in the mixed relay. He is the brother of the South African swimmer, Riaan Schoeman. His bronze at Rio in 2016 is the first Olympic medal South Africa has won in the sport. In 2021, he competed in the men's triathlon at the 2020 Summer Olympics held in Tokyo, Japan.

Career
Schoeman was a strong swimmer at school and soon progressed to be a strong talent at long-distance swimming for his country. He switched sports to take up the triathlon in his mid-teens and won the Under 19 South African championship in consecutive years.  However, he suffered stress fractures in his shins in 2009 which kept him from competing for two years. A mountain bike accident in 2011 then ruled him out of competition but allowed him time to recuperate and build strength in his legs, allowing him to return to competition stronger.

Schoeman won the 2016 ITU World Triathlon Series Grand Final September 18, 2016, placing him 4th overall for the series. 
Schoeman was due to finish 3rd, but Alistair Brownlee slowed to help his brother Jonny over the line. During this assist, Schoeman passed the Brownlee brothers and won gold. In the run-up
to the Rio games, Schoeman was suffering from a suspected respiratory illness, stating after the race: "I have had fever the whole week. The doctor only gave me the all-clear to be on the start line yesterday".

References 

1991 births
Living people
Afrikaner people
South African people of German descent
South African male triathletes
Triathletes at the 2016 Summer Olympics
Olympic triathletes of South Africa
Medalists at the 2016 Summer Olympics
Olympic medalists in triathlon
Olympic bronze medalists for South Africa
Commonwealth Games medallists in triathlon
Commonwealth Games gold medallists for South Africa
Commonwealth Games silver medallists for South Africa
People from Vereeniging
Triathletes at the 2018 Commonwealth Games
Sportspeople from Gauteng
Triathletes at the 2020 Summer Olympics
20th-century South African people
21st-century South African people
Medallists at the 2018 Commonwealth Games